In theoretical linguistics, a converb (abbreviated ) is a nonfinite verb form that serves to express adverbial subordination: notions like 'when', 'because', 'after' and 'while'. Other terms that have been used to refer to converbs include adverbial participle, conjunctive participle, gerund, gerundive and verbal adverb (Ylikoski 2003).

Converbs are differentiated from coverbs, verbs in complex predicates in languages that have the serial verb construction.

Converbs can be observed in Turkic languages, Mongolic languages, and Tungusic languages.

Etymology
The term was coined for Khalkha Mongolian by Ramstedt (1902) and until recently, it was used mostly by specialists of Mongolic and Turkic languages to describe non-finite verbs that could be used for both coordination and subordination. Nedjalkov & Nedjalkov (1987) first adopted the term for general typological use, followed by Haspelmath & König (1995).

Description
A converb depends syntactically on another verb form, but is not its argument. It can be an adjunct, an adverbial, but it cannot be the only predicate of a simple sentence or clausal argument. It cannot depend on predicates such as 'order' (Nedjalkov 1995: 97).

Examples
 On being elected president, he moved with his family to the capital.
 He walks the streets eating cakes.

Khalkha Mongolian:

The converb -megc denotes that as soon as the first action has been begun/completed, the second action begins. Thus, the subordinate sentence can be understood as a temporal adverbial. There is no context in which the argument structure of another verb or construction would require -megc to appear, and there is no way (possibly except for afterthought) in which a -megc-clause could come sentence-final. Thus, -megc qualifies as a converb in the general linguistic sense.

However, from the viewpoint of Mongolian philology (and quite in agreement with Nedjalkov 1995 and Johanson 1995), there is a second converb in this sentence: -ž. At its first occurrence, it is modified by the coverb ehel- ‘to begin’ and this coverb determines that the modified verb has to take the suffix. Yet, the same verbal suffix is used after the verb ‘to beat’ which ends an independent non-finite clause that temporally precedes the following clause but without modifying it in any way that would be fit for an adverbial. It would be possible for -ž to mark an adverbial:

Such "polyfunctionality" is common. Japanese and Korean could provide similar examples, and the definition of subordination poses further problems. There are linguists who suggest that a reduction of the domain of the term converb to adverbials does not fit language reality (e.g. Slater 2003: 229).

References

 Haspelmath, Martin & König, Ekkehard (eds.) 1995. Converbs in cross-linguistic perspective. Berlin: Mouton de Gruyter.
 Johanson, Lars (1995): On Turkic Converb Clauses. In: Haspelmath & König 1995: 313–347.
 Nedjalkov, Vladimir P. & Nedjalkov, Igor’ V. (1987): On the typological characteristics of converbs. In: Toomas Help (ed.): Symposium on language universals. Tallinn, 75–79.
 Nedjalkov, Vladimir (1995): Some Typological Parameters of Converbs. In: Haspelmath & König 1995: 97-136.
 Ramstedt, Gustav John (1902): Über die Konjugation des Khalkha-Mongolischen. Helsingfors: Finnischen Litteraturgesellschaft.
 Slater, Keith (2003): A Grammar of Mangghuer. London: RoutledgeCurzon.
 Ylikoski, Jussi (2003): "Defining non-finites: action nominals, converbs and infinitives." SKY Journal of Linguistics 16: 185–237. 

Parts of speech